Walter Frescura (born 12 May 1940) is an Italian former sport shooter who competed in the 1972 Summer Olympics, in the 1976 Summer Olympics, and in the 1980 Summer Olympics.

References

1940 births
Living people
Italian male sport shooters
ISSF rifle shooters
Olympic shooters of Italy
Shooters at the 1972 Summer Olympics
Shooters at the 1976 Summer Olympics
Shooters at the 1980 Summer Olympics
20th-century Italian people